The Yiddisher Boy is a 1909 film directed by Sigmund Lubin.

Plot
The plot is about Moses who lives on the Lower East Side and helps support his family by selling papers. When one of the other newsboys tries to rob Moses, Ed comes to his rescue. Moses invites Ed over for Shabbat dinner. When Ed is run down by a passing bicycle, Moses visits his friend in the hospital and uses his last pennies to help him. Years later Moses is a successful merchant, and Ed, down on his luck, comes looking for a job. Moses recognizes his old friend and offers him the best job he has.

References

Films set in New York City
1909 films
Films about Jews and Judaism
Films set in Manhattan